Wanke may refer to:

Daouda Malam Wanké (1946–2004), military and political leader in Niger
Jutta Wanke (born 1948), German swimmer
Larry Wanke, American football player
5762 Wänke, main belt asteroid

See also
Vanke